National freeway 4 is a freeway that begins in Qingshui District, Taichung at Provincial Highway 17 and ends in Tanzi District at Provincial Highway 74.

Length
The total length is 28.0 km (17.4 miles).

Major cities along the route
Taichung City

Exit List

Lanes
The lanes in each direction are listed below.
3 lanes:
Qingshui Top - Fengshi IC
2 lanes:
Fengshi IC-Tanzi System

See also
 Highway system in Taiwan

Notes
Completed in November 2001.

The Fengshi - Tanzi section was opened on 16 January 2023.

References

External links
 Taiwan Area National Freeway Bureau, MOTC 

Freeway No. 04